The Obermünster, or Obermünster Abbey, Regensburg, was a collegiate house of canonesses (Frauenstift) in Regensburg, Bavaria, second only to Niedermünster in wealth and power.

History 
The Obermünster ("higher monastery", named in relation to the older Niedermünster, or "lower monastery"), dedicated to the Assumption of the Virgin Mary, was founded in the early 9th century by the ruling house of the Carolingians as a Benedictine nunnery to complement the adjacent St. Emmeram's Abbey. It passed almost immediately into the possession of the bishops of Regensburg, at that date also abbots of St. Emmeram's, but King Louis the German recovered it by exchanging Mondsee Abbey for it in 833. His widow, Hemma, became abbess of Obermünster, although she was buried in St. Emmeram's. In the early 10th century it was a private monastery of the family of the Dukes of Bavaria. The nunnery and its church were destroyed by fire in 1002, and was rebuilt and revitalised by Emperor Henry II, who is traditionally considered its founder, and who made it an Imperial abbey — judicially independent, but in this case without territorial sovereignty.

In 1219 it was put under Papal protection and in 1315 Emperor Louis the Bavarian elevated the abbesses to the Reichsfürstentum, or Imperial principality, after which they were known as Princess-abbesses ("Fürstäbtissinnen").

Repeated attempts to reform the rule of life and to return the house to its original Benedictine practice failed and in 1484 Obermünster formally became a collegiate house for noblewomen (adlige Frauenstift), which is what it had in any case been in practice for many years.

During the 17th and 18th centuries the buildings and church were refurbished in the Baroque style.

It was dissolved in 1810 during the secularisation of Bavaria. The last canonesses remained there in retirement until 1822, after which it became a seminary. In 1862 the episcopal boys' seminary was also established there.

In 1944 bombs destroyed the church and part of the claustral buildings. After the war the central episcopal archive, the library, part of the diocesan museum and other diocesan service functions were accommodated in the buildings that remained.

Abbesses of Obermünster 

 Hemma ?–876
 Mathilde c. 900/945
 Irmgard
 Salome
 Wikpurg 1020–29
 Willa 1052–89
 Hazecha 1089–?
 Hadamuda 1117
 Hadwiga 1142–77
 Euphemia von Helffenstein 1193
 Gertrud I 1216
 Jutta 1259
 Gertrud II 1265
 Wilburg von Leuchtenberg 1272
 Ryssa I von Leuchtenberg 1286–92
 Ryssa II von Dornberg 1299
 Bertha Walterin ?–1325
 Adelheid von Arenbach
 Katharina von Murach
 Agnes I von Wunebach ?–1374
 Elisabeth I von Parsberg 1374–1400
 Elisabeth II von Murach 1400–02
 Margarethe I Sattelbogerin ?–1435
 Barbara von Absberg 1435–56
 Kunigunde von Egloffstein 1456–79
 Sibylla von Paulsdorff 1479–1500
 Agnes II von Paulsdorff 1500–?
 Katharina II von Redwitz 1533–36, died 1560
 Wandula von Schaumberg 1536–42
 Barbara II von Sandizell ?–1564
 Barbara III Ratzin 1564–79
 Magdalena von Gleissenthal 1579–94
 Margarethe II Mufflin 1594–1608
 Katharina Praxedis von Perckhausen 1608–49
 Maria Elisabeth von Salis 1649–83
 Maria Theresia von Sandizell 1683–1719
 Anna Magdalena Franziska von Dondorff 1719–65
 Maria Franziska von Freudenberg 1765–75
 Maria Josepha von Neuenstein-Hubacker 1775–1803

See also 
 Niedermünster, Regensburg

Sources 
   Klöster in Bayern: Obermunster

Monasteries in Bavaria
Regensburg
Christian monasteries established in the 9th century
Christian monasteries established in the 11th century
Bavarian Circle